Mid-Valley Christian Academy was  a private Christian school in Monmouth, Oregon, United States. It was located at the Ash Creek Bible Church.

References

High schools in Polk County, Oregon
Monmouth, Oregon
Christian schools in Oregon
Education in Polk County, Oregon
Private middle schools in Oregon
Private elementary schools in Oregon
Private high schools in Oregon